The cantons of Périgueux are administrative divisions of the Dordogne department, in southwestern France. Since the French canton reorganisation which came into effect in March 2015, the town of Périgueux is subdivided into 2 cantons. Their seat is in Périgueux.

Population

References

Cantons of Dordogne